Christian Hansen Tandberg (28 October 1872 – 1951) was a Norwegian farmer and politician for the Agrarian Party.

He was born at Nykirke in Modum as a son of farmer Hans Christiansen Tandberg (1841–1905) and his wife Ingeborg, née Kittilsdatter (1834–1919). He took petty officer training in the field artillery from 1893 to 1896, and worked as a policeman in Drammen until 1901, when he took over the family farm. He also continued on the military books, reaching the rank of lieutenant in 1930. He was a member of Modum municipal council from 1910 to 1916, 1919 to 1928 and 1931 to 1934, and served as deputy mayor from 1922 to 1925. He was also a member of the school board from 1906 to 1912. He was elected to the Parliament of Norway in 1933, representing the constituency of Buskerud. He served one term.

References

1872 births
People from Modum
Norwegian farmers
Centre Party (Norway) politicians
Buskerud politicians
Members of the Storting
1951 deaths